The Terre Haute REX are a collegiate summer baseball team based in Terre Haute, Indiana. They are a member of the summer collegiate Prospect League.

They are managed by Tyler Wampler.

The Rex play home games at Bob Warn Field at Sycamore Stadium, also the home of Indiana State University's baseball team.

The Terre Haute Rex are named after a prominent product with a historic connection to the community.  Rex Coffee, produced by Clabber Girl, the “Imperial blend, fit for a Monarch” was roasted and packed in downtown Terre Haute, with a history dating back over a century. Patented in 1905, Rex Coffee was a household name from Chicago to Louisville; and from Cincinnati to St. Louis. The selection of the 'Rex' name continues a Terre Haute tradition of unique baseball team names that includes the Huts, Tots, Stags, Terre-iers and Highlanders.

2011
In 2011, a new team fight song, titled "Come On Rex!" debuted at the home contests. "Come On Rex" was written by Alan Barcus, an Indiana State University alum and the composer of the popular song "You're My Cubs!" which has played inside Wrigley Field at Chicago Cubs home games for several seasons.

2012
The Indiana State University Athletics Department Facilities and Game Management crew were hired by the REX prior to the start of the 2012 season and were named the 2012 Prospect League Rookie Grounds Crew of the Year following the season.

Manager Brian Dorsett was tabbed the Manager of the Year (sharing the honor with Dubois County's Ryan Anderson); the Rex also had three All-Stars.
Relief Pitcher Nick Blount, Shortstop Nick Johnson and Centerfielder Kyle Kempf.

Seasons

Roster

References

Prospect League teams
Amateur baseball teams in Indiana
Terre Haute, Indiana
2010 establishments in Indiana
Baseball teams established in 2010